The Complex may refer to:

The Complex (album), by Blue Man Group
The Complex (band), an Irish punk rock band
The Complex (film), 2013 film directed by Hideo Nakata
The Complex (Valdosta, Georgia), a multi-purpose arena
The Complex (video game), a 2020s video game released by Wales Interactive
The Complex: An Insider Exposes the Covert World of the Church of Scientology, 2008 book by John Duignan
The Complex: How the Military Invades Our Everyday Lives, 2008 book by Nick Turse

See also
Complex (disambiguation)